Tarqi (also Romanized as Tarqī; also known as Targhī, Taraghghi, Taraqqī, and Targbi) is a village in Roqicheh Rural District, Kadkan District, Torbat-e Heydarieh County, Razavi Khorasan Province, Iran. At the 2006 census, its population was 372, in 84 families.

References 

Populated places in Torbat-e Heydarieh County